Unicron is a fictional villain from the Transformers media franchise. Designed by Floro Dery, he was introduced in the 1986 animated film The Transformers: The Movie and has since reappeared in Transformers: Armada, Transformers: Energon, Transformers: Cybertron, Transformers: Prime, Transformers: The Last Knight and Atari's 2004 Transformers video game. Unicron is a prodigiously large robot whose scale reaches planetary proportions, and he is also able to transform into a giant planet. Unicron's origin has expanded over the years from simply being a large robot to being a god of chaos who devours realities. He often employs the help of Decepticons in his work, and in some stories is considered part of the origin of the Decepticon forces.

Fictional character biography
According to the Transformers lore, before the dawn of time, Order and Chaos exist within an extra-dimensional entity known as The One. To explore the fledgling universe, he creates the astral being known as Unicron, and then subdivides him, creating his twin, Primus.

Physical dimensions
Unicron's size is never specified in any canon materials, aside from the vague term "planet size". In The Transformers: The Movie, Unicron's height appears to be anywhere from several kilometers (as when handling Galvatron) to several hundred kilometers (as when attacking and destroying Lithone and Cybertron's moons, and attacking Cybertron). A planet-mode diameter of  has been suggested and robot-mode dimensions can follow from that estimate, provided that there is no change in size (compression or expansion) common among so many Transformers. One scene in the movie shows Jazz driving out of one of Unicron's eyes, just small enough to fit through them, though in another scene the Quintesson ship Hot Rod arrived in is tiny compared with the eye. Unicron is also small enough to stand on Cybertron's surface.

Animated series

The Transformers
The character Unicron first appears in the opening scene of 1986's The Transformers: The Movie, immediately making clear his goal by consuming the small world of Lithone. Subsequently, when the Decepticons Megatron, Skywarp, Thundercracker, and the Insecticons are set adrift in space and left to die following a furious battle with the Autobots, Unicron appears before them and offers Megatron a deal: in exchange for a new body, and new troops, Megatron will destroy the Autobot Matrix of Leadership, the only thing that can stand in Unicron's way. Thus, Unicron rebuilds Megatron into a new and more powerful body and rechristens him to Galvatron. He then uses the battered bodies of the other Decepticons and creates Scourge, the Sweeps and Cyclonus. Unicron also gives Galvatron a vessel, and Galvatron begins to carry out his assigned task, although he is loath to do so. When Galvatron shows any signs of opposition to Unicron's will, Unicron inflicts agonizing torture in his mind to coerce him into obedience.

Following Unicron's consumption of Cybertron's two moons, Galvatron obtains the Matrix from Ultra Magnus, believing he can use it to bring Unicron under his control. Attempting to open the Matrix to intimidate Unicron, Galvatron only prompts his transformation into robot mode and is swallowed by the planet-eater. Unicron lays waste to Cybertron, halted briefly when the young Autobot rookie, Hot Rod, crashes a Quintesson spacecraft through his eye. Finding Hot Rod inside Unicron's body, Galvatron suggests an alliance against their common enemy. However, Unicron inflicts his mental torture upon Galvatron, forcing him to fight Hot Rod. Hot Rod seizes the Matrix from Galvatron during the fight and becomes Rodimus Prime. Rodimus throws Galvatron into space, freeing him from Unicron's mind-control. Rodimus opens the Matrix within Unicron, destroying his body, leaving only his head, which becomes a moon of Cybertron.

Unicron was voiced by Orson Welles.

The third season of The Transformers animated series continues Unicron's story where the movie left off, as the planet-eater's deactivated head settles into orbit around Cybertron. His head is visited by Cyclonus, who accesses the memory bank to discern the fate of Galvatron. Later, the ghost of the deceased Decepticon Starscream reactivates Unicron's head and enters into a bargain with him, performing three labors in exchange for the restoration of his body. Starscream (inhabiting and controlling Scourge's body) gathers for Unicron Metroplex's eyes (breaking one and replacing it with one from Trypticon) and Trypticon's transformation cog. He begins to connect his head to Cybertron, which would become Unicron's new body. Starscream demands that Unicron restore his own body so that he can complete the required connections. Once Unicron does so, Starscream double-crosses him and refuses to finish the job. Unicron's head is subsequently blown off into space by an explosion instigated by the Autobots.

Later, when searching for a new supply of positrons (anti-electrons), the Decepticons venture to Unicron's head, where Cyclonus and Scourge accidentally awake the slumbering demi-god. At the same time, Grimlock constructs the Technobots from pieces of Unicron's head, and one of their number, Strafe, severs enough of Unicron's neural connections to shut him back down.

Although Unicron himself does not appear again, his origin in the animated series is later revealed. Unicron was created near the beginning of the universe by the diminutive genius known as Primacron, who intended for him to devour all life in the universe, leaving a blank slate that Primacron could use as he saw fit. However, Unicron turned upon Primacron, deciding that he would rule the universe and subsequently set out to achieve that goal.

Unicron trilogy
Unicron would appear in Transformers Armada, voiced by Mark Acheson. In episode 23, several of the human allies discover Sideways within their computers, and attempt to stop him, but not before learning that his accomplice was Unicron within the mainframe acting as a failsafe. The final season depicts Unicron as the main antagonist. Called the Unicron Battles, the Transformers Earth groups return to Cybertron. The humans learn Unicron had made the Minicons to take control of Cybertron, but the Minicons revolted and become part of the Transformers' own civil war. 

Unicron appears in the sequel series Transformers: Energon, set 10 years after the Unicron Battles. The autobots successfully destroy Unicron, but Unicron manages to place his consciousness within Megatron. In the final episode, Megatron is corrupted by Unicron, leading to another confrontation with Optimus Supreme. Around this time, Primus, Unicron's sibling, creates an energon sun and attempts trap Unicron's soul with it. Both he and Megatron are destroyed for good, and the energon sun recreates Alpha's planets that were destroyed long ago.

Aligned continuity
In the Transformers: Prime storyline, Unicron (voiced by John Noble) is the source of Dark Energon, a poisonous and corruptive form of Energon with the ability to revive the dead - albeit in a mindless, zombie-like "Terrorcon" state - also known by the name "the blood of Unicron". Unicron is believed to represent the Anti-Spark (most likely a counterpart of the AllSpark).

Publication history

Fun Publications
When Unicron attacks Cybertron in the midst of the chaos caused by a Mini-Con civil war, Sentinel Maximus and Omega Prime fight him off with the help of their allies. In the end Unicron is driven off, badly wounded, by Primus.

Unite Warriors
In conjunction with the Unite Warriors line, Takara Tomy released a comic detailing how the Galvatronus combiner came to be. Following his defeat at the conclusion of The Headmasters, Galvatron's icy tomb is discovered by Cyclonus, whose body Galvatron modifies to accommodate his own head in the chest compartment. Seeking a more fitting form, Galvatron directs Cyclonus to approach the disembodied head of Unicron, who is convinced to help Galvatron attain a combiner form with Cyclonus as its core. To accomplish this, Unicron opens dimensional rifts in order to bring Curse Armada Thrust, Zombie War Breakdown, and Wandering Roller into their world. To Cyclonus' surprise, Starscream makes an appearance, expressing interest in joining this new alliance. Unicron  grants Starscream a new physical form, and Galvatron's head takes control of his new minions to take on his new form of Galvatronus.

Film series

Debuting in Transformers: The Last Knight, the six horns of Unicron began appearing out of the Earth in response to the approach of Cybertron. Unicron is noted by Quintessa to be another name for Earth, and Optimus Prime recognizes Unicron as Cybertron's ancient enemy. Quintessa plans to drain Unicron's energy to restore the damaged Cybertron, killing life on Earth in the process. Simmons later helps Burton locate an ancient book containing details about Unicron, noting that the center-point of Unicron's horns (during the era when all of the Earth's continents formed Pangaea) is Stonehenge. Megatron and Quintessa begin draining energy from Unicron but are foiled, and later Quintessa (disguised as a human) approaches a scientist studying one of Unicron's horns to warn him not to touch the chaos-bringer and offers a way to kill him.

Video games
Unicron is among the characters appearing in the 2004 Transformers video game for the PlayStation 2.<ref>Atari Begins the ``Ultimate Conflict with Worldwide Release of 'TRANSFORMERS' Video Game, Business Wire, May 12, 2004</ref> Unicron begins attacking Cybertron, requiring the Autobots to collect enough Mini-cons to create a power-up mode for Optimus Prime. The player must chase Unicron as he orbits around Cybertron and enters his maw as he prepares to fire, blasting him with the Matrix Cannon until eventually Unicron is destroyed.

Unicron is mentioned a number of times in Transformers: Prime  The Game. Eons ago, Unicron created Thunderwing to serve him and destroy the Matrix of Leadership. After Unicron's demise, a meteor of Dark Energon with Thunderwing sealed within crashes on Earth. Optimus Prime comes across the meteor and finds Thunderwing who reveals that he is a minion of Unicron and his mission was to destroy the Matrix. Thunderwing seeks help from the Decepticons for the repairs needed. He fails thanks to the combined efforts of Prime and Jack Darby and falls into a volcano.

Toys
 'Armada Unicron with Dead End (2003)
The Armada figure came with its own Mini-Con, which transforms into a cannon-equipped 'moon' to Unicron's 'planet', looking very similar to the Death Star of Star Wars fame. At various points in production, Unicron's Mini-Con was originally going to be called Nebulon, the name of the homeworld of the Headmaster, Targetmaster and Powermaster partners, and also Gobotron, the homeworld of the Transformers' competitive toyline in the 80's, the Go-Bots. Designer Aaron Archer did not want such a historical action figure to be overshadowed by a Go-Bots pun, so the name was changed to Dead End, re-using a name of one of the original Stunticons. A multitude of these Mini-Cons was featured in the Armada cartoon, although they were portrayed simply as non-transforming internal defensive "laser pods," instead of actual Mini-Cons.
This toy was voted the 52nd top toy released in the last 10 years by ToyFare magazine.

 Cybertron Deluxe Unicron (2005)
A Deluxe size figure. The figure was packaged on a Decepticon cardback, and that the character's profile in the Transformers Collectors' Club magazine also included a Decepticon symbol. The actual story featuring the character, however, presents him as unaffiliated, serving only his own ends. In line with this, the toy lacks a faction symbol - a rare but not unheard of occurrence in the Transformers line, with examples including Micromasters, the Generation 2 Go-Bots, Cybertron Safeguard, SDCC exclusive Skywarp, and movie Armorhide. 

 Titanium 3 inch UnicronA three-inch tall Decepticon which doesn't transform. It is packaged holding one of Cybertron's moons.

 Robot Heroes Optimus Prime and UnicronUnicron is sold as a Decepticon, one half of a two-pack.

 Transformers 2010 Unicron (2010)
A redeco and remold of the Armada Unicron figure was released in late 2010 as part of Takara Tomy's "Welcome to Transformers 2010" promotion, which celebrates the year in which the third season of The Transformers was set in Japan. Designed to resemble Unicron as seen in The Transformers: The Movie, pre-release photos issued by Takara Tomy show a new head and changes to the molding of the torso, as well as deco based on his movie appearance. He retains the Mini-Con partner.

 Generations 25th Anniversary Unicron (2011)
The U.S. release of the 2010 Unicron redeco is an Amazon.com exclusive to commemorate the 25th anniversary of The Transformers: The Movie. The included Dead End Mini-Con is renamed Kranix (after the last remaining inhabitant of the planet Lithone).Transformers Siege War For Cybertron Unicron ' (2019)
A 27-inch tall figure that weighs 19 pounds (8.6 kg), the tallest transformer to-date. From the Transformers: War for Cybertron Trilogy series and the widest diameter of any transformers figure with 30 inches, a larger diameter than the previous record holder (Fortress Maximus) by over 4 inches. It is sold with interchangeable chins, and can be switched between a smooth chin and a goatee-style chin, reminiscient of The Transformers: The Movie. The figure also comes with a custom stand as well as a mini Decepticon'' Galvatron figure.

References

External links
 Beast Wars Neo Unicron Prototype
 
 Unicron at TFWIKI.Net, the Transformers Wiki

Extraterrestrial supervillains
Fiction about megastructures
Fictional avatars
Fictional characters with superhuman strength
Fictional demons and devils
Fictional giants
Fictional gods
Fictional mass murderers
Fictional murderers
Fictional planets
Fictional telepaths
Film characters introduced in 1986
Male characters in animated series
Male film villains
Male supervillains
Science fiction weapons
Transformers characters
Weapons of mass destruction in fiction
Video game bosses
Villains in animated television series